Pier Antonio Capobianco (26 January 1619 – 30 October 1689) was a Roman Catholic prelate who served as Bishop of Lacedonia from 1663 to 1672.

Biography
Pier Antonio Capobianco was born in Naples, Italy, on 26 January 1619. On 12 March 1663, he was appointed during the papacy of Pope Alexander VII as Bishop of Lacedonia. He served as Bishop of Lacedonia until his resignation on 9 September 1672. He died on 30 October 1689.

Episcopal succession

See also
Catholic Church in Italy

References

External links and additional sources
 (for Chronology of Bishops) 
 (for Chronology of Bishops) 

17th-century Italian Roman Catholic bishops
Bishops appointed by Pope Alexander VII
1619 births
1689 deaths